Brij Bhushan Mehra was speaker of Punjab Legislative Assembly and a leader of Indian National Congress. He was killed by the suspected militants in 1991 in Amritsar.

References

Victims of Sikh terrorism
1991 deaths
Politicians from Amritsar
Speakers of the Punjab Legislative Assembly
Members of the Punjab Legislative Assembly
People murdered in Punjab, India
Victims of the insurgency in Punjab
Assassinated Indian politicians
Year of birth missing
Indian National Congress politicians from Punjab, India